The 26th Expeditionary Rescue Squadron is a provisional unit of the United States Air Force, assigned to Air Combat Command to activate or inactivate as needed.

The squadron was first activated at Albrook Air Force Base, Panama Canal Zone in November 1952 as the 26th Expeditionary Rescue Group it performed search and rescue missions in the Caribbean for the next four years before inactivating in December 1956.  It was converted to provisional status in December 2002.

History

Search and rescue in the Caribbean
The squadron activated in November 1952 at Albrook Air Force Base in the Panama Canal Zone as the 26th Air Rescue Squadron when Air Rescue Service expanded its existing rescue squadrons into groups and replaced their existing flights with newly formed squadrons. The 26th absorbed the equipment, personnel and mission of the former Flight A, 1st Air Rescue Squadron, which was simultaneously discontinued. The squadron flew search and rescue and aeromedical evacuation operations primarily over land and water areas around Panama, but extending into Central America and northwestern areas of South America, until it was inactivated in late 1956.

Expeditionary operations
As an expeditionary unit, the 26th has been activated several times during the Global War on Terror.  The squadron is manned and equipped by deployed airmen from regular, Air National Guard, and reserve rescue units deployed from their home bases.

Lineage 
 Constituted as the 26th Air Rescue Squadron on 17 October 1952
 Activated on 14 November 1952
 Inactivated on 8 December 1956
 Redesignated 26th Expeditionary Rescue Squadron and converted to provisional status on 12 December 2002
 Activated on 20 March 2003
 Inactivated on 10 September 2003
 Activated February 2009
 Inactivated 1 January 2014
 Activated 1 September 2015

Assignments
 1st Air Rescue Group (attached to Caribbean Air Command for operational control), 14 November 1952 – 8 December 1956
 Air Combat Command to activate or inactivate at any time after 12 December 2002
 438th Air Expeditionary Wing, 20 March–10 September 2003
 451st Expeditionary Operations Group, February 2009
 651st Air Expeditionary Group, 29 June 2011 – 1 January 2014
 1st Expeditionary Rescue Group, 1 September 2015 – present

Stations
 Albrook Air Force Base, Panama Canal Zone, 14 November 1952 – 8 December 1956
 Jacobabad, Pakistan, 20 March–10 September 2003
 Camp Bastion, Afghanistan, February 2009 – 1 January 2014
 Southwest Asia, 1 September 2015 – present

Aircraft
 Grumman SA-16 Albatross, 1952-1956
 Sikorsky H-5, 1952-1954
 Sikorsky H-19, 1954-1956
 Sikorsky SH-19, 1954-1956
 HH-60 Pave Hawk, unknown

References

Notes

Bibliography

Campaigns
 Global War on Terrorism: Afghanistan: Consolidation III

External links
 
 
 

Rescue squadrons of the United States Air Force